The 1981 Suisse Open Gstaad was a men's tennis tournament played on outdoor clay courts in Gstaad, Switzerland. It was the 36th edition of the tournament and was held from 6 July through 12 July 1981. The tournament was part of the 1981 Volvo Grand Prix tennis circuit. Third-seeded Wojciech Fibak won the singles title.

Finals

Singles
 Wojciech Fibak defeated  Yannick Noah 6–1, 7–6
 It was Fibak's 1st singles title of the year and the 12th of his career.

Doubles
 Heinz Günthardt /  Markus Günthardt defeated  David Carter /  Paul Kronk 6–4, 6–1

References

External links
 Official website
 Association of Tennis Professionals (ATP) – Tournament profile
 International Tennis Federation (ITF) – Tournament details

Swiss Open (tennis)
Swiss Open Gstaad
1981 Grand Prix (tennis)